Fodé Guirassy (born 6 January 1996) is a professional footballer who plays as a forward for  club Stade Briochin. Born in France, he has represented Guinea at youth international level.

Club career
In July 2021, Guirassy joined Bulgarian First League club Cherno More. In January 2022, he signed a contract with Championnat National 2 team Canet Roussillon. However, after only six months at the club, he joined Championnat National side Stade Briochin.

International career
Born in France, Guirassy chose to represent Guinea at international level. He was part of the Guinea under-23 team at the 2016 Toulon Tournament.

References

External links
 

1996 births
Living people
French sportspeople of Guinean descent
Black French sportspeople
Association football forwards
French footballers
Guinean footballers
Championnat National players
Championnat National 2 players
Championnat National 3 players
First Professional Football League (Bulgaria) players
ASM Belfort players
Stade Lavallois players
AS Béziers (2007) players
US Orléans players
PFC Cherno More Varna players
Canet Roussillon FC players
Stade Briochin players
French expatriate footballers
Expatriate footballers in Bulgaria
French expatriate sportspeople in Bulgaria